The 2021 Norwegian Second Division was a third-tier Norwegian women's football league season. The league consisted of 70 teams divided into 8 groups. AaFK Fortuna and Grand Bodø were promoted and no teams were relegated. Reserve teams were not eligible for promotion.

League tables

Group 1
Sarpsborg 08 − promotion play-offs
Ullensaker/Kisa
Røa 2
Snøgg
Grei 2
Kolbotn 2
Høybråten og Stovner
Hallingdal
Gjelleråsen

Group 2
Odd − promotion play-offs
Nanset
Gimletroll
Vålerenga 2
Øvrevoll Hosle 2
Stathelle
Arendal/Sørfjell
Sandefjord
Runar
Eik Tønsberg

Group 3
LSK Kvinner 2
Lyn 2
Frigg − promotion play-offs
Stabæk 2
Kongsvinger
Raufoss
Storhamar
Bærums Verk Hauger
Fart 2
Ottestad

Group 4
Viking − promotion play-offs
Bryne
Fyllingsdalen
Arna-Bjørnar 2
Kaupanger
Avaldsnes 2
Haugar
Loddefjord
Klepp 2
Staal Jørpeland
Stord
Lura

Group 5
AaFK Fortuna − promotion play-offs
Molde
Rosenborg 2
Byåsen
Herd
Tynset
Volda
Nardo
Hødd
Træff

Group 6
Grand Bodø − promotion play-offs
Grand Bodø 2
Halsøy
Bossmo & Ytteren
Brønnøysund
Innstranden
Sandnessjøen

Group 7
Mjølner − promotion play-offs
Medkila 2
Sortland
Kilkameratene
Harstad

Group 8
Bossekop − promotion play-offs
Tromsdalen
Fløya 2
Senja/Finnsnes
Porsanger
Polarstjernen
HIF/Stein

Promotion play-offs
AaFK Fortuna, Bossekop and Viking received a bye to the second stage. Two teams were to be promoted, as there was no play-off against the second-to-bottom team of the First Division.

First stage

Group 1
Odd − advance to second stage
Frigg − advance to second stage
Sarpsborg 08

Group 2
Grand Bodø − advance to second stage
Mjølner

Second stage

Group 1
AaFK Fortuna − promoted
Frigg
Bossekop

Group 2
Grand Bodø − promoted
Viking
Odd

References

External links
2021 Norwegian Second Division at RSSSF

Norwegian Second Division (women) seasons
3
Norway
Norway